"Please Don't Tease" is a 1960 song recorded by Cliff Richard and the Shadows. Recorded in March and released as a single in June, the song became their third No. 1 on the UK Singles Chart spending three weeks at the summit. The song was written by the Shadows' rhythm guitarist Bruce Welch together with Pete Chester.

Release
To decide upon the release of this track as a single, Richard's record company recruited a teenage panel to listen to and vote on a selection of his unreleased tracks. "Please Don't Tease" won the vote and was duly released, "Nine Times Out of Ten" came second and was the follow-up single.

The single also reached number 1 in India, Ireland, New Zealand, Norway and Thailand. The single sold 1.59 million copies worldwide.

"Please Don't Tease" was included on the EP Cliff's Silver Discs, released December 1960. Its first inclusion on an LP was Cliff's Hit Album, released July 1963.
 
In 1978, the song was revisited in a contemporary arrangement and added to his live repertoire. It was played without the Shadows at their reunion concerts in March 1978 (as recorded on Thank You Very Much), and recorded in the studio and released as the B-side of "Please Remember Me" in July 1978.

Track listing
 "Please Don't Tease" – 2:59
 "Where Is My Heart" – 2:12

Personnel
 Cliff Richard – vocals
 Hank Marvin – lead guitar
 Bruce Welch – rhythm guitar
 Jet Harris – bass guitar
 Tony Meehan – drums

Chart performance

References

1960 singles
1960 songs
Cliff Richard songs
Song recordings produced by Norrie Paramor
Songs written by Bruce Welch
UK Singles Chart number-one singles
Irish Singles Chart number-one singles
Number-one singles in New Zealand
Number-one singles in Norway
Columbia Graphophone Company singles